The 2021–22 Old Dominion Monarchs men’s basketball team represented Old Dominion University in the 2020–21 NCAA Division I men's basketball season. The Monarchs, led by ninth-year head coach Jeff Jones, played their home games at Chartway Arena in Norfolk, Virginia as members of the East division of Conference USA. They finished the season 13–19, 8–10 in C-USA play to finish in fifth place in the East division. They lost to UTEP in the second round of the C-USA tournament.

On October 27, 2021, Old Dominion announced that the season would be the last for the team in C-USA and that they would join the Sun Belt Conference on July 1, 2022.

Previous season
In a season limited due to the ongoing COVID-19 pandemic, the Monarchs finished the 2020–21 season 15–8, 11–5 in C-USA play to finish in second place in East division. They lost in the quarterfinals of the C-USA tournament to North Texas.

Offseason

Departures

Incoming transfers

2021 recruiting class

Roster

Schedule and results 

|-
!colspan=12 style=| Exhibition

|-
!colspan=12 style=| Non-conference regular season

|-
!colspan=12 style=| Conference USA regular season

|-
!colspan=12 style=| Conference USA tournament

Source

References

Old Dominion Monarchs men's basketball seasons
Old Dominion Monarchs
Old Dominion Monarchs basketball
Old Dominion Monarchs basketball